Imogen Bankier (born 18 November 1987) is a businesswoman and former badminton player from Scotland. After starting playing the sport at the age of 9, Bankier won the national championships at every age level from Under 17 upwards. The highlight of her professional career was reaching the final of the mixed doubles at the 2011 World Championships in Wembley, London. She and her partner Chris Adcock were defeated in the match by the Chinese team of Zhang Nan and Zhao Yunlei.

Personal life 
Bankier is right handed, 5 ft 7in tall and used equipment manufactured by Yonex, one of her sponsors. Her other sponsor is Glenkeir Whiskies which is run by her father, Celtic chairman Ian Bankier. Imogen was one of several high-profile British and International players to speak out against the Badminton World Federation's plan to force female players to wear short skirts. The BWF claimed the move was aimed at "raising badminton's profile and that of women players" whereas Bankier hit back "I will fight to make sure this dated and simply sexist rule does not happen."

As of 2016 Bankier resides in Paris, France, running a whisky store on the Place De La Madeleine in the 8th arrondissement.

Career 
Bankier started playing badminton at the age of nine in what she describes as "very competitive Bankier family games in the back garden." Before competing at senior level in 2007, she won women's doubles and mixed doubles titles in the Under-17, Under-19, Under-21 and Under-23 age groups as well as various international open championships in doubles. Since making the step up she has taken a total of sixteen Scottish titles, six coming in the women's doubles and ten in the mixed doubles.

Bankier's first major international tournament was the 2008 European Championships in Herning, Denmark where she lost out to the English pair in the quarter-finals of both doubles tournaments. She returned to compete in the mixed doubles at the 2010 Commonwealth Games in Delhi, India where she again fell to an English pairing (who would go on to win silver) in the quarter-finals.

Bankier's career highlight to date however came on 14 August 2011 when she won a silver medal in the mixed doubles event at the World Championships. In a surprise run, she and her English partner Chris Adcock defeated four seeded pairs before losing out 21–15, 21–7 to the world number 1 pair of Zhang Nan and Zhao Yunlei in the final. Despite being somewhat disappointed with her personal performance in the final, Bankier was quoted as saying that her play in the tournament as a whole would hopefully increase her chances of being selected for the 2012 London Olympics. She and Adcock followed this up a year later by winning a bronze medal at the European Championships in Karlskrona, Sweden. Shortly before these championships the pair broke into the top 10 of the world rankings for the first time.

On 30 May 2012, Bankier and Adcock were selected to represent Great Britain in the badminton mixed doubles at the 2012 London Olympics but were surprisingly eliminated in the opening round. On 30 October 2012, she was leaving the team GB training group stating "The GB programme is geared towards long-term development of a system for British badminton, but I don’t believe the environment and the programme at Milton Keynes are the best way forward for me, for Rio in 2016." This also ended her partnership with Adcock. She thanked the team for helping her develop as a player and stressed that she was not thinking of retiring but was joining Badminton Scotland to prepare for the 2014 Commonwealth Games in her home city. In that championship she won bronze medal with Robert Blair, defeating the Malaysian pair Chan Peng Soon and Lai Pei Jing in the play off match.

Her most recent mixed doubles partner was fellow Scot Robert Blair and her women's doubles partner was Bulgarian Petya Nedelcheva.

In February 2015, after winning the Scottish National Championships in doubles and mixed doubles, it was announced that she was "taking something of a sabbatical as she tries to decide what her sporting future holds". Bankier stated she had decided not to try and qualify for the 2016 Summer Olympics in Rio de Janeiro as she said she was struggling to find a partner she likes playing with. She stated that she has started working for her father's whisky business, Glenkeir Whiskies.

After the 2016 Nationals, where Bankier won her record 10th consecutive mixed doubles titles. Before the match she was presented with an award for her services to the game by Badminton Scotland president Dan Travers. Before the game Chief Executive Anne Smillie paid tribute:

"She is by far the most successful women's player Scotland has produced and has enjoyed a tremendous badminton career. Now we hope her new business career is just as successful. Today she is bidding for her 10th consecutive mixed doubles title to go with her six women’s doubles titles. But little did we know back in 2007 that Imogen Bankier would go on to become not just the best in Scotland but one of the world’s best doubles players."

Achievements

BWF World Championships 
Mixed doubles

Commonwealth Games 
Mixed doubles

European Championships 
Mixed doubles

BWF Grand Prix 
The BWF Grand Prix had two levels, the Grand Prix and Grand Prix Gold. It was a series of badminton tournaments sanctioned by the Badminton World Federation (BWF) and played between 2007 and 2017.

Mixed doubles

  BWF Grand Prix Gold tournament
  BWF Grand Prix tournament

BWF International Challenge/Series/European Circuit 
Women's doubles

Mixed doubles

  BWF International Challenge tournament
  BWF International Series/ European Circuit tournament

References 

1987 births
Living people
Sportspeople from Glasgow
Scottish female badminton players
Badminton players at the 2012 Summer Olympics
Olympic badminton players of Great Britain
Badminton players at the 2010 Commonwealth Games
Badminton players at the 2014 Commonwealth Games
Commonwealth Games bronze medallists for Scotland
Commonwealth Games medallists in badminton
Medallists at the 2014 Commonwealth Games